Little Akaloa is a small settlement and bay on Banks Peninsula, in the South Island of New Zealand.

The names of both Akaroa and Little Akaloa mean long harbour in the southern dialect of Māori.

Demographics

It is part of the larger Eastern Bays-Banks Peninsula statistical area.

Little Akaloa had a population of 9 at the 2018 New Zealand census, unchanged since the 2013 census and the 2006 census., but a significant drop from its earlier population. Wise's New Zealand guide reported a population of 63 in 1969.

References

Banks Peninsula
Bays of Canterbury, New Zealand
Populated places in Canterbury, New Zealand